Carl Richard Stanley Johnson (born 15 October 1976) is a Swedish professional golfer.

Johnson was born in Stockholm. His paternal grandfather is an American from New Jersey who settled in Sweden and married a Swede. Johnson played on the European Tour and won the ANZ Championship in 2002.

Johnson joined the PGA Tour in 2003 after successfully negotiating qualifying school. He has managed to gain at least partial status on the tour every year since. He placed in the top 50 of the money list in 2006. He earned his card for the 2008 PGA Tour season at the 2007 PGA Tour Qualifying Tournament. He won his first title in 2008, the U.S. Bank Championship in Milwaukee, but has not had much further PGA Tour success. Johnson won the Scandinavian Masters in 2010 on the European Tour. In 2016, Johnson earned a European Tour card through Q School.

Johnson was formerly a pro skateboarder. He also played handball and tennis in his youth.

Johnson resides in Jupiter, Florida.

Professional wins (5)

PGA Tour wins (1)

PGA Tour playoff record (0–1)

European Tour wins (2)

1Co-sanctioned by the PGA Tour of Australasia

Challenge Tour wins (1)

Nordic Golf League wins (1)

Results in major championships

Note: Johnson never played in the Masters Tournament.

CUT = missed the half-way cut
"T" = tied

Results in The Players Championship

CUT = missed the halfway cut
"T" indicates a tie for a place

Results in World Golf Championships

"T" = Tied

See also
2002 PGA Tour Qualifying School graduates
2007 PGA Tour Qualifying School graduates
2010 PGA Tour Qualifying School graduates
2016 European Tour Qualifying School graduates

References

External links

Swedish male golfers
PGA Tour golfers
European Tour golfers
Swedish people of American descent
Golfers from Stockholm
People from Jupiter, Florida
1976 births
Living people